The Modified Mercalli intensity scale (MM, MMI, or MCS), developed from Giuseppe Mercalli's Mercalli intensity scale of 1902, is a seismic intensity scale used for measuring the intensity of shaking produced by an earthquake. It measures the effects of an earthquake at a given location, distinguished from the earthquake's inherent force or strength as measured by seismic magnitude scales (such as the "" magnitude usually reported for an earthquake). While shaking is caused by the seismic energy released by an earthquake, earthquakes differ in how much of their energy is radiated as seismic waves. Deeper earthquakes also have less interaction with the surface, and their energy is spread out across a larger volume. Shaking intensity is localized, generally diminishing with distance from the earthquake's epicenter, but can be amplified in sedimentary basins and certain kinds of unconsolidated soils.

Intensity scales empirically categorize the intensity of shaking based on the effects reported by untrained observers and are adapted for the effects that might be observed in a particular region. By not requiring instrumental measurements, they are useful for estimating the magnitude and location of historical (preinstrumental) earthquakes: the greatest intensities generally correspond to the epicentral area, and their degree and extent (possibly augmented by knowledge of local geological conditions) can be compared with other local earthquakes to estimate the magnitude.

History
Italian volcanologist Giuseppe Mercalli formulated his first intensity scale in 1883. It had six degrees or categories, has been described as "merely an adaptation" of the then standard Rossi–Forel scale of 10 degrees, and is now "more or less forgotten". Mercalli's second scale, published in 1902, was also an adaptation of the Rossi–Forel scale, retaining the 10 degrees and expanding the descriptions of each degree. This version "found favour with the users", and was adopted by the Italian Central Office of Meteorology and Geodynamics.

In 1904, Adolfo Cancani proposed adding two additional degrees for very strong earthquakes, "catastrophe" and "enormous catastrophe", thus creating a 12-degree scale. His descriptions being deficient, August Heinrich Sieberg augmented them during 1912 and 1923, and indicated a peak ground acceleration  for each degree. This became known as the "Mercalli–Cancani scale, formulated by Sieberg", or the "Mercalli–Cancani–Sieberg scale", or simply "MCS", and was used extensively in Europe and remains in use in Italy by the National Institute of Geophysics and Volcanology (INGV).

When Harry O. Wood and Frank Neumann translated this into English in 1931 (along with modification and condensation of the descriptions, and removal of the acceleration criteria), they named it the "modified Mercalli intensity scale of 1931" (MM31). Some seismologists refer to this version the "Wood–Neumann scale". Wood and Neumann also had an abridged version, with fewer criteria for assessing the degree of intensity.

The Wood–Neumann scale was revised in 1956 by Charles Francis Richter and published in his influential textbook Elementary Seismology. Not wanting to have this intensity scale confused with the Richter magnitude scale he had developed, he proposed calling it the "modified Mercalli scale of 1956" (MM56).

In their 1993 compendium of historical seismicity in the United States, Carl Stover and Jerry Coffman ignored Richter's revision, and assigned intensities according to their slightly modified interpretation of Wood and Neumann's 1931 scale, effectively creating a new, but largely undocumented version of the scale.

The basis by which the U.S. Geological Survey (and other agencies) assigns intensities is nominally Wood and Neumann's MM31. However, this is generally interpreted with the modifications summarized by Stover and Coffman because in the decades since 1931, "some criteria are more reliable than others as indicators of the level of ground shaking". Also, construction codes and methods have evolved, making much of built environment stronger; these make a given intensity of ground shaking seem weaker. Also, some of the original criteria of the most intense degrees (X and above), such as bent rails, ground fissures, landslides, etc., are "related less to the level of ground shaking than to the presence of ground conditions susceptible to spectacular failure".

The categories "catastrophe" and "enormous catastrophe" added by Cancani (XI and XII) are used so infrequently that current USGS practice is to merge them into a single category "Extreme" abbreviated as "X+".

Modified Mercalli intensity scale
The lesser degrees of the MMI scale generally describe the manner in which the earthquake is felt by people. The greater numbers of the scale are based on observed structural damage.

This table gives MMIs that are typically observed at locations near the epicenter of the earthquake.

Correlation with magnitude 

The correlation between magnitude and intensity is far from total, depending upon several factors, including the depth of the hypocenter, terrain, and distance from the epicenter. For example, a magnitude 7.0 quake in Salta, Argentina, in 2011, that was 576.8 km deep, had a maximum felt intensity of V, while a magnitude 2.2 event in Barrow in Furness, England, in 1865, about 1 km deep, had a maximum felt intensity of VIII.

The small table is a rough guide to the degrees of the MMI scale. The colors and descriptive names shown here differ from those used on certain shake maps in other articles.

Estimating site intensity and its use in seismic hazard assessment 
Dozens of intensity-prediction equations have been published to estimate the macroseismic intensity at a location given the magnitude, source-to-site distance, and perhaps other parameters (e.g. local site conditions). These are similar to ground motion-prediction equations for the estimation of instrumental strong-motion parameters such as peak ground acceleration. A summary of intensity prediction equations is available. Such equations can be used to estimate the seismic hazard in terms of macroseismic intensity, which has the advantage of being related more closely to seismic risk than instrumental strong-motion parameters.

Correlation with physical quantities 
The MMI scale is not defined in terms of more rigorous, objectively quantifiable measurements such as shake amplitude, shake frequency, peak velocity, or peak acceleration. Human-perceived shaking and building damages are best correlated with peak acceleration for lower-intensity events, and with peak velocity for higher-intensity events.

Comparison to the moment magnitude scale 
The effects of any one earthquake can vary greatly from place to place, so  many MMI values may be measured for the same earthquake. These values can be displayed best using a contoured map of equal intensity, known as an isoseismal map. However, each earthquake has only one magnitude.

See also 
 Japan Meteorological Agency seismic intensity scale (Shindo scale)
 Rohn emergency scale
 Seismic intensity scales
 Seismic magnitude scales
 Spectral acceleration
 Strong ground motion

References

Notes

Citations

Sources

.

.

.

.

.

.

Further reading

External links 
 National Earthquake Information Center (U.S.)
 Modified Mercalli Intensity Scale – United States Geological Survey
 The Severity of an EarthquakeUnited States Geological Survey
 U.S. Earthquake Intensity Database – NOAA
 Earthquake IntensityWhat controls the shaking you feel? – IRIS Consortium

Seismic intensity scales
Italian inventions